Little Caraway Creek is a  long 3rd order tributary to Caraway Creek, in Randolph County, North Carolina.

Course
Little Caraway Creek rises on the Caraway Creek and Uwharrie River divide about 0.5 miles south of Hillsville in Randolph County, North Carolina.  Little Caraway Creek then flows south to meet Caraway Creek about 1 mile northeast of Motleta.

Watershed
Little Caraway Creek drains  of area, receives about 46.4 in/year of precipitation, has a topographic wetness index of 365.93 and is about 61% forested.

See also
List of rivers of North Carolina

References

Rivers of North Carolina
Rivers of Randolph County, North Carolina